Deepak Singh is a leader of the  Indian National Congress party in Uttar Pradesh, India. On 10 June 2016, he was elected to the Uttar Pradesh Legislative Council.
Deepak Singh was born on 26 September 1975 to the royal family of Sewai Hemgarh, Gauriganj district Amethi, Uttar Pradesh. His father Late Mr Raj Karan Singh and is married to Late Mrs. Shanti Singh.  From the days of his college life he was inclined towards social service and student politics.

Early life
He completed his graduation from Awadh University, Faizabad.
Aside from his involvement in Politics, he is an agriculturalist and a social worker. His core belief is that politics must be only used to serve the people.

Political career
Deepak Singh and his family have a stronghold in the area. While Singh has been elected as head of Block Pramukh twice in the past, He was elected as Block Pramukh from Shahgarh Block, Amethi, Uttar Pradesh in 1995–2005. In order to strength the party at the cadre level he was appointed as the secretary of the party in the year 2002. Deepak Singh was the incharge of Uttar Pradesh Youth Congress and N.S.U.I It is believed that both the frontals were gained strength during his tenure.  Deepak Singh was made Uttar Pradesh Congress General Secretary in (2012-till present).

In 2014, just before Lok Sabha election, Deepak Singh was appointed as chairman of the Union Railway Ministry's PSC with a minister of state status but he resigned from the post soon after the formation of the NDA government at the Centre protesting against hike in rail fare.

In 2016 Uttar Pradesh MLC election Deepak Singh was contesting on Congress Party's ticket the election wasn't a cakewalk, as the party lacked numbers, Singh once again proved his metal by defeating BJP’S Vice President in the 12th Round.

He was appointed as the Chairman of Regulation Committee U.P. Vidhan Parishad on 18 June 2018
Deepak singh has appointed as  leader of upper house of Uttar Pradesh Assembly  UP 2018 and is very popular among youth and media for constantly exposing the government on various fronts of corruption and ill - governance. Deepak singh has an image of always being available to the party workers.

References

Living people
Members of the Uttar Pradesh Legislative Council
1975 births
Dr. Ram Manohar Lohia Avadh University alumni
Indian National Congress politicians from Uttar Pradesh